FAI Films was an Australian film production company known for the 1992 animated film FernGully: The Last Rainforest.

Name
The studio was owned by the Australian company Fire and All Risks Insurance (later FAI Insurance), founded by Lawrence Adler. Both companies shared the FAI "running man" logo.

Productions
The company produced only one theatrical release, FernGully: The Last Rainforest in 1992, and a direct-to-video sequel, FernGully 2: The Magical Rescue, in 1998.

Demise
In 1998, FAI Insurance was acquired by HIH Insurance, which collapsed in March 2001. In June 2012, administrators for HIH placed advertisements trying to sell the rights to both films. On November 11th, 2021 Shout! Factory announced a deal with Machine Media Advisors, stated to be the owner of the rights to FernGully, for worldwide distribution rights to the first film.

References

Defunct mass media companies of Australia
Australian companies established in 1992